is a Japanese football player and he is current manager Japan Football League club of Honda Lock.

Club statistics

References

External links
 

1987 births
Living people
Fukuoka University alumni
Association football people from Miyazaki Prefecture
Japanese footballers
J1 League players
J2 League players
Japan Football League players
Avispa Fukuoka players
Honda Lock SC players
Association football defenders